Daniel O'Keeffe may refer to

Daniel O'Keeffe (judge)
Daniel O'Keeffe (swimmer)

See also
Daniel O'Keefe (disambiguation)